Florence Township is one of the twelve townships of Williams County, Ohio, United States.  The 2000 census found 2,115 people in the township, 1,087 of whom lived in the unincorporated portions of the township.

Geography
Located in the western part of the county along the Indiana line, it borders the following townships:
Northwest Township - north
Bridgewater Township - northeast corner
Superior Township - east
Center Township - southeast corner
St. Joseph Township - south
Troy Township, DeKalb County, Indiana - southwest
Richland Township, Steuben County, Indiana - west

The villages of Blakeslee and Edon are located in Florence Township: Blakeslee in the southeast, and Edon in the west.  The unincorporated community of Berlin is located in the township's northwest.

Name and history
Florence Township was organized in 1837. Statewide, the only other Florence Township is located in Erie County.

Government
The township is governed by a three-member board of trustees, who are elected in November of odd-numbered years to a four-year term beginning on the following January 1. Two are elected in the year after the presidential election and one is elected in the year before it. There is also an elected township fiscal officer, who serves a four-year term beginning on April 1 of the year after the election, which is held in November of the year before the presidential election. Vacancies in the fiscal officership or on the board of trustees are filled by the remaining trustees.

References

External links
County website

Townships in Williams County, Ohio
Townships in Ohio